Lucas Terrace railway station, also known as Lucas Terrace Halt railway station, served the area of Lucas Terrace, Plymouth, England from 1905 to 1951 on the Plymouth to Yealmpton Branch.

History 
The station opened in October 1905 by the London and South Western Railway. Like the other stations on the line, trains were diverted to  due to damage on the original  station in the Second World War. The station closed on 15 January 1951 but reopened on 2 July 1951, only to close again later the same year on 10 September.

References

External links 

Disused railway stations in Devon
Former London and South Western Railway stations
Railway stations opened in 1905
Railway stations closed in 1951
1905 establishments in England
1951 disestablishments in England
Railway stations in Great Britain opened in the 20th century